Suková is a female form of the Czech surname Suk. Notable people with the surname include:

 Helena Suková (born 1965), Czech tennis player 
 Věra Suková (1931–1982), Czechoslovakian tennis player

Surnames of Czech origin